The movements of the Southern Dragon style (traditional name Lung Ying) of Shaolin Boxing are based on the mythical Chinese dragon. The Dragon style is an imitative-style that was developed based on the imagined characteristics of the mythical Chinese dragon.

The Dragon played an influential and beneficial role in Chinese culture. An amalgam of several creatures, including monitor lizards, pythons and the Chinese alligator, the polymorphic dragon was a water spirit, responsible for bringing the rains and thus ensuring the survival of crops. The dragon was the symbolic guardian to the gods, and was the source of true wisdom. This latter feature most likely resulted from the observation of the living reptilian counterparts which, usually at rest, seem to be in a near constant state of contemplation.

The dragon represented two of the ancient elements, Earth and Water, endowing the creature with powers of illusion and strength. A Yang symbol, the Taoists saw the dragon as a personification of the Tao itself—"the Dragon reveals himself only to vanish". Shaolin Buddhists saw him as a vision of enlightened truth, to be felt, but never to be held. Certain very old men were called dragons, these being well versed in the life-supporting skills of herbal medicine, agriculture, and kung fu. In early China, these skills were surely a matter of life or death, and those so educated were held in high regard.

History
 
The history of Southern Dragon style has historically been transmitted orally rather than by text, so its origins will probably never be known in their entirety. Modern Southern Dragon style's history can be reliably traced to the monk Daai Yuk Sim Si who was the abbot of Huashoutai (华首台) (White Hair) temple on Mount Luofu (罗浮山). No reliable records of the style's origin prior to that exist, though there is much speculation regarding the subject.

Southern Dragon style has roots in a combination of the local styles of the Hakka heartland in inland eastern Guangdong with the style that the monk Ji Sin Sim Si taught in Guangdong and the neighboring province of Fujian in the 18th century.

North of the Dongjiang in the northwest of Bóluó County in the prefecture of Huizhou in Guangdong Province is the sacred mountain Luófúshān.
Luófúshān is the site of many temples, including Wa Sau Toi where, c. 1900, a Chan (Zen) master named Daai Yuk taught Southern Dragon style to Lam Yiu Gwai (1874–1965), who in turn passed the art on to the many students of his schools in Guangzhou.

Lam Yiu Gwai and Jeung Lai Chuen (1880-1966) were good friends from their youth in the Dongjiang region of Huizhou, longtime training partners and later cousins by marriage. Lam and Jeung would open several schools together, and Southern Dragon style and Jeung's style of Bak Mei share many similarities.

A variation of the Southern Dragon style is taught by the Long Choo Kung Fu Society based in Penang, Malaysia and with branches in Australia. Founded by Li Ah Yu and his father near the turn of the 20th century, this association claims it is teaching a Soft/ Hard Dragon style originating from Fukkien province.

Methods and philosophy
Southern Dragons kung fu is essentially an internal qi (pronounced chi) cultivation method, but initialisation training is far more like a hard, external style, than the delicate approach an internal (like t'ai chi ch'uan or baguazhang) would have. In learning the moves, the student will strike hard, block hard and rush into each position, with the idea of learning the proper place to be once each movement is complete. Eventually, the method of transmitting power is retained, and the physically strengthened body is able to make transitions in the proper, fluid manner. In turn, this dragon-like smoothness helps disguise the attack, making it extremely difficult for an adversary to effectively counter.

Once a purely physical semblance to flow has been mastered, the disciple incorporates the deep hissing sounds to train chi flow. Inhaling is silent, but exhalation is deliberate, tense and controlled. Inhaling lightens the body for aerial maneuvers, while exhaling drives power into each technique. Blocking is dispensed with, and parries or simple strikes substituted. At this point, novice and advanced student show very little in common.

On the highest level, an opponent is allowed to tire himself out, evasion becoming the Dragon's key defense. Qi control is highly developed, and the degree to which the body must be moved to redirect or avoid impact is under greater control.

The forms (Taolu 套路) that constitute this system are divided by complexity into three categories, and are enumerated below:

Basic
16 Movements/Holes
Passing Bridge Three Times
Fierce Tiger Leaping Over Wall
Rescue Master From Single Side
Single Sword and Mount
Press and Hit from Four Sides
Eagle Claw
Bridge Smashing
Intermediate
Touch Bridge (introduces sticking hands)
Venomous Snake Moves Tongue
Hua King's Fist
Standing Five-Form
Cross Standing Five-Form
Turn to Hook and Hit
Five Horses Returning to Stable
Advanced
Plum Flower Punch
Seven Ways of Plum Flower Punch

In each form, one is taught to "ride the wind", a phrase which in large part means follow rather than lead. Provide no opening without first letting your opponent open. Unlike Crane, which also relies heavily upon evasion as a tactic, the Dragon evades primarily by rotation of upper or lower torso with straight and zig-zag stance movements, while the Crane stylist hops frequently to reposition the entire body. Both styles employ pinpoint strikes to vulnerable meridian targets, but dragon also heavily uses tiger-like punches and clawing techniques, snake-like stance shifts, and leopard-like hit and run strikes to weaken a physically superior adversary. Southern Dragon kung fu also regularly employs low sweeping techniques, but these are not unique; most senior stylists of any kung fu system use these on a weakened adversary.

Techniques

Overview
The southern dragon stylist relies on a variety of fighting techniques that can be employed for a wide range of needs. The style uses techniques that can cripple or kill an opponent if the need arises or it can be used simply to control a minor street fighting situation.

Lung Ying (Dragon form) focuses mainly on powerful, short to medium range attacks, as is common among southern Chinese styles of kung fu. Gripping techniques and extensive use of forearms typify the art. The style was created as an aggressive combat art and operates under the basic assumption that you are trying to either disable your opponent to the point that they are no longer a threat in battle, or kill them, though these are not by any means the only options a Lung Ying practitioner has. As such Lung Ying employs a large number of techniques to damage the opponent's joints either through joint manipulation or direct striking; nullify the opponent's defenses either through breaking their stance or compromising their guard, and thus their ability to defend; and others.  Like most southern style kung fu, it has initially limited kicks and jumps (they are common in the advanced levels) and consisted mainly of fist, palm and clawing techniques. Power generated from the waist using soft hard jin (see neijin and waijin).

Lung Ying training also involves an extensive amount of iron body training. Hardening the forearms especially is considered essential to the style as it makes such extensive use of them. Depending on the particular school any of a fairly large pool of traditional training methods will be used to toughen the body. Three, five and seven star conditioning drills, pea buckets, weighted ropes, sand bags, and striking poles are all common in Lung Ying schools. It really isn't possible to separate Lung Ying conditioning from its methods, the two work hand in hand, each needing the other to be completely effective.

Basics
The Southern Dragon Kung Fu practitioner typically attacks with winding low yang; that is, powerful and quick movements. For example, when striking with the fist, more power can be exerted when the movement originates from the feet, is guided by the waist, flows through the body, and exits through the fist.

Foot work
In Southern Dragon style, leg work is characterized by a zig-zag motion that mimics the imagined movement of the mythical Chinese dragon. This also allows one to use floating, spitting, swallowing and sinking movements which are very important in generating power and stability, making your body calm and relaxed.

Though the Lung Ying footwork pool is deep, it generally centers on two basic types of stepping. The first is "Zig Zag" stepping (dragon stepping). Basically with each step forward, the rear foot moves forward and becomes the forward foot. However, the step is not taken directly forward but basically follows the angle the front foot is turned at (about 33 degrees). This has the effect of moving the Lung Ying practitioner forward and off to an angle while offering some protection to the groin from attack.  This type of stepping allows a Lung Ying practitioner to press his opponent (usually used before the opponent's center has been taken) while launching attacks from angles that are difficult for the opponent to defend. The Lung Ying practitioner seems to be constantly moving into an uncomfortable range and at an angle that forces their opponent to reposition their whole body to defend against, or else torque their torso around thus breaking their structure and disconnecting them from the power generation machinery of their lower body.

The second basic type of stepping is Bik Bo stepping, or press stepping. In this method the front foot moves forward and the rear foot drags up to get back to the basic position. This stepping generally covers less distance than the dragon stepping, and is used to press the opponent. It will frequently be used once the Lung Ying practitioner has begun to press their attack in earnest or is exploiting some advantage. There are specific methods for stretching this footwork out addressed in various forms. One of the primary purposes of this footwork is to keep the Lung Ying practitioner "on top of" their opponent and in attacking range. Also, this type of stepping is heavily used in various stance breaking methods.

Southern Dragon style motto 
克己讓人非我弱 存心守道任他 "Control yourself, let others do what they will.
This does not mean you are weak.
Control your heart, obey the principles of life.
This does not mean others are strong".

Codes of Southern Dragon style
The seeds were first planted from Haufeng; the essence was gained later at Haushou
Restrain one's self and yield to others not because one is weak, but to uphold the ethical Tao and let the others have their claim.

Four rules of the Southern Dragons
Focus to train and condition the body.
Be righteous and uphold your honor.
Respect your parents, honor your teacher.
Treat others with honesty, treat your friends with loyalty.

Dragon style in popular culture

The 2010 show A Fistful of Stances has used this in episode 22 and 23.
The style was performed by Jackie Chan in his films Dragon Lord and Dragon Fist.
Dragon is one of the three fighting styles utilized by the character Sub-Zero in the Mortal Kombat series (as seen in Mortal Kombat: Deadly Alliance and Mortal Kombat: Deception) and the character Jarek in Mortal Kombat: Armageddon. It is also Liu Kang's grapple style in Mortal Kombat: Shaolin Monks.  Onaga, the boss character of Mortal Kombat: Deception, also uses a fighting style named Dragon.  However, this is not the true Dragon style (as used by Sub-Zero); it is simply named as such due to Onaga being an actual dragon.
The Dragon fighting style is used at times by the police officer Lei Wulong in Tekken.
On Avatar: The Last Airbender and The Legend of Korra, some firebending techniques were based on Southern Dragon Kung Fu. 

These are all examples of Běilóngquán (Northern Dragon Fist), rather than the aforementioned Southern Dragon Fist (Nánlóngquán).

References

External links
Dongjiang Dragon Style (Dongjiang Lungxing). 

History of Southern Dragon Style Kung Fu by Steve Martin (2003)  Retrieved October 7, 2004.

Dragon Style Kung Fu by Lisa Neuweld (1999) Retrieved October 7, 2004.
Lineage of Dragon Kung Fu  Retrieved October 7, 2004.
Information about Southern Dragon Style Kung Fu 
An introductory article on Dragon Kung Fu 
Images of a person doing Dragon Kung Fu 
Wah Nam Lung Ying History Australia
Yip's Dragon Style Kung Fu New York

Chinese martial arts
Martial arts of Hakka origins
Buddhist martial arts